Farg Qaleh (also Romanized as Fark Qaleh) is a village in Qaleh-ye Bala Rural District, in the Farah Dasht District of Kashmar County, Razavi Khorasan Province, Iran.

This city was founded via the merging of two villages named Farg and Qaleh Bala.

References 

Populated places in Kashmar County